The 2020 season is Sport Club Internacional's 110th season in existence. As well as the Campeonato Brasileiro, the club competes in the Copa do Brasil, the Campeonato Gaúcho and the Copa Libertadores.

Players

Squad information
Players and squad numbers last updated on 25 August 2020. Appearances include league matches only.Note: Flags indicate national team as has been defined under FIFA eligibility rules. Players may hold more than one non-FIFA nationality.

Transfers

In

Loans in

Out

Loans out

Pre-season and friendlies

Competitions

Overview

Campeonato Gaúcho

For the 2020 Campeonato Gaúcho, the 12 teams are divided into two groups.  In the first group phase, teams play against those in the same group.  In the second group phase, teams will play against teams in the other group.  In each group phase, the top two teams in each group will advance to the semi-finals.

First Phase - Group A

Matches

Semifinal

Second Phase - Group A

Matches

Semifinal

Final

Campeonato Brasileiro Série A

League table

Results summary

Results by round

Matches

Copa do Brasil

Round of 16

Quarterfinals

Copa Libertadores

Qualifying stages

Second stage

Third stage

Group stage

Round of 16

Statistics

Appearances and goals

|-
! colspan=14 style=background:#DCDCDC; text-align:center| Goalkeepers

|-
! colspan=14 style=background:#DCDCDC; text-align:center| Defenders

|-
! colspan=14 style=background:#DCDCDC; text-align:center| Midfielders

|-
! colspan=14 style=background:#DCDCDC; text-align:center| Forwards

|-
! colspan=14 style=background:#DCDCDC; text-align:center| Players transferred out during the season

Goalscorers

Clean sheets

Disciplinary record

Last updated: 30 August 2020

References

External links
 official website

Sport Club Internacional seasons
Sport Club Internacional